Operation Revenge or Operation Entegham (Persian: عملیات انتقام) was an operation during Iran–Iraq War, which was launched by the Islamic Republic of Iran Air Force on 22 September 1980. The commencement of the operation was about 2 hours after the formal outbreak of Iran–Iraq War which was started by the attacks of Iraqi forces. At operation revenge, 8 fighter jets—of Iran bombed 2 military bases of Iraq.

At this operation, Iranian air force planned an operation by the name of Entegham (revenge); two wings (air groups) by the name of "Alborz" and "Alfard" from the 3rd fighter base of Hamedan and the 6th fighter base of Bushehr had the duty of battle against Iraqi forces.

The Iranian pilot colonel, Javad Fakoori was the commander of Islamic Republic of Iran Air Force, and swiftly announced for an emergency situation—after Iraq attacks—and recalled all senior commanders of Nahaja (IRIAF) to be gathered in Tehran; he declared in a formal meeting concerning the necessity of a decisive/fast response to the (Iraqi) attacks.

At the mentioned operation, at the initial step, the first wing of Iranian fighter bases—Alborz base—flew at 16:30 and bombed Sho'aibiyeh air (military) base which is located in Basra Governorate; afterwards another wing (Alfard) flew at 17:25 and bombed Kut air base in Maysan Governorate. During this operation (beside Operation Kaman 99), Iraqi economic/military centers were hit by 140 Iranian fighter planes.

See also 
 22 September 1980 Iraqi airstrike on Iran
 Operation Kaman 99

References 

Airstrikes during the Iran–Iraq War
Airstrikes conducted by Iran
1980 in aviation
Iran–Iraq War
Airstrikes in Iraq